WZRH is a radio station owned by Cumulus Media. The station, whose frequency is 92.3 MHz with an effective radiated power of 100 kW, is licensed to Laplace, Louisiana and serves the greater New Orleans and Baton Rouge metropolitan areas. Its studios are located at the Place St. Charles building in Downtown New Orleans and its main transmitter is located in Vacherie, Louisiana.

History

1966-2004: WCKW
The station signed on the air in 1966 as WCKW. During its first 29 years of its existence, its previous formats included country, classic rock, active rock, all-1980s, adult contemporary (including a rebrand from "The Point" to "Lite 92.3" on November 4, 2003), and adult top 40.

2004-2007: Rhythmic AC
"Diva 92.3"
On November 18, 2004, WCKW 'unveiled' the "Diva" format and changed its call letters to WDVW, playing mostly rhythmic pop, classic Disco and Dance music from the 1970s, 1980s, and 1990s. From 2005 to 2007, WDVW was also a reporter to the Billboard Magazine Dance/Mix Show Airplay panel.

When it debuted with the format, its slogan was "Music For The Diva In You", a reference to the female audience it targeted and the high quotient of female artists on its playlist. But despite the name and slogan, it also attracted males as well. In September 2005, they would later change the slogan to "New Orleans' New #1 Feel Good Station!" The reason for that was to bring music and normality back to the area after Hurricane Katrina struck. They were also the first radio station in the market to resume regular music programming after the disaster ended.

WDVW was one of two "Divas" in Louisiana. Its sister station in Baton Rouge, WCDV (Diva 103.3), was the other, although WDVW can also be heard in that area as well. But on September 18, 2006, WCDV returned to an Adult Contemporary direction, a move that might have made sense due to the overlapping of two "Divas" in Baton Rouge, which hurt WCDV ratings wise.

2007-2010: Adult top 40 
On December 20, 2007, WDVW switched directions to adult top 40 for its second go-round, this time as "Mix 92.3." The station has dropped most of the Dance fare in favor of current Hot AC product, with recurrents from the 1980s and 1990s and a modern-leaning direction. The station never produced impressive ratings, and given New Orleans' reception toward Hot AC/Adult Top 40 in the past, most notably WLTS, this format has never performed well in this market.

2010-2014: Rock
On July 23, 2010, at approximately 2:50 p.m., after playing "Need You Now" by Lady Antebellum, the station began stunting with Mardi Gras-themed music. At 4:00 p.m., the station became "Rock 92-3," using the slogan "New Orleans' Rock Station", and adopting their current callsign WRKN. The first song on "Rock 92-3" was "Check My Brain" by Alice in Chains. The move to a rock format was driven by the recent format change of KOBW, which had aired a similar format.

2014-2016: Country 
On January 3, 2014, at 9 a.m., after playing "No Sleep till Brooklyn" by The Beastie Boys, WRKN began stunting with a "Wheel of Formats", with the launch of a new format on January 6 at 9:23 AM. Like WDVW, it too was not successful ratings-wise, given New Orleans' history with rock formats. At the promised time, the station returned to country, branded as "Nash FM 92-3." The first song on "Nash" was "Radio" by Darius Rucker.

On April 21, 2016, WRKN altered its format, expanding its presence to target the adjacent Baton Rouge market while tweaking its format towards a mix of 1990s and current songs. The new shift comes with a positioning change to “The Gulf South’s Country Giant”. With the change, Scott Innes joined the station for middays. Innes spent fifteen years at WYNK in Baton Rouge prior to his exit in 2011. He also is a cartoon voice actor best known for being the voice of many Hanna Barbera characters including Norville "Shaggy" Rogers, Scooby-Doo and Scrappy-Doo.

2017-present: Alternative 
On June 19, 2017, at Noon, WRKN swapped formats and call signs with WZRH, with WRKN flipping to alternative rock as "Alt 92-3" and assuming the WZRH call sign. Simultaneously, WRKN's country format moved to WZRH as "106.1 Nash FM".

During the impact of Hurricane Ida in August 2021, WZRH's main tower in Vacherie, shared with KVDU, toppled as a result of high winds.

References

External links

Radio stations in New Orleans
Cumulus Media radio stations
Radio stations established in 1966
1966 establishments in Louisiana
Modern rock radio stations in the United States